Chi Delta Theta (also Chi Delt) is an Asian-American Interest sorority based in California. The organization strives to promote sisterhood, community service, academics, cultural awareness and social activity in the lives of its members.

History

Establishment
Chi Delta Theta was established at the University of California, Santa Barbara on October 13, 1989 by Alison Suto and Joanne Yamaoka. With nineteen founding members, Chi Delta Theta became the first Asian-American interest sorority to be recognized by the university.

Founding Mothers

Alison Suto and  Joanne Yamaoka along with seventeen founding sisters formed the Alpha chapter of Chi Delta Theta, the first Asian-American interest sorority on the University of California, Santa Barbara campus.

Expansion
Additional chapters were soon established, and growth has continued over the following 30 years.

Chi Delta Theta's regional expansion began with a colony at Cal Poly, SLO which chartered as the Beta chapter in 1993. It reached Northern California with establishment of Epsilon chapter in 2000 at UC Davis. The sorority now has seven chapters and one colony, all in California. The organization is open to national expansion.

The sisterhood has exhibited steady growth and continued participation of alumnae members, with over 500 sisters across California. The organization prides itself continuing bonds among all members including alumnae and members of its chapters.

Symbols and traditions
The colors of the sorority are Pink and Silver.  
The official flower is the Orchid.
In certain printed and electronic media, including the official website, the sorority refers to members as "sxsters", perhaps in a nod to diversity.

Chapters
These are the chapters of Chi Delta Theta.  Active chapters and colonies are noted in bold, inactive chapters are noted in italics.

See also
List of social fraternities and sororities

References

External links

Fraternities and sororities in the United States
Asian-American culture in California
Asian-American fraternities and sororities
Student organizations established in 1989
1989 establishments in California